Charles Paul Gogolak (in Hungarian: Gogolák Károly Pál, born December 29, 1944) is a retired American football placekicker.

The sixth overall selection of the 1966 NFL Draft, Gogolak was signed out of Princeton University by the Washington Redskins, marking the first time that a placekicker was selected in the first round.  He played for the Redskins, as well as the New England Patriots.  Gogolak was one of the first "soccer style" placekickers in the NFL, along with his older brother Pete.  The brothers combined to score fourteen extra points in a single game in 1966, tied for the most ever, in a 72–41 win over the New York Giants. Charlie made nine of ten PAT's and a game-ending field goal while Pete converted on five of six extra points.

References

External links
 Career stats

1944 births
Living people
American football placekickers
Boston Patriots players
New England Patriots players
Princeton Tigers football players
Washington Redskins players
Hungarian emigrants to the United States
Hungarian players of American football